Alamdar (also Romanized as ‘Alamdār) is a village in Soleyman Rural District, Soleyman District, Zaveh County, Razavi Khorasan Province, Iran. At the 2006 census, its population was 518, in 108 families.

See also 

 List of cities, towns and villages in Razavi Khorasan Province

References 

Populated places in Zaveh County